Conrad Lanoue (October 18, 1908 – October 15, 1972) was an American jazz pianist and arranger.

Early life
Lanoue was born in Cohoes, New York on October 18, 1908. He started on piano when he was ten years old and attended the Troy Conservatory.

Later life and career
He began his career in his 20s, playing piano at hotels in his hometown. He recorded with Red McKenzie in 1935, and under the combined leadership of trumpeter Eddie Farley and trombonist Mike Riley in 1935–36. Also in the 1930s he worked for Louis Prima, then Wingy Manone from 1936 to 1940 and pianist Joe Haymes. From the 1940s to the 1960s, he was a member of bands led by Lester Lanin and Charles Peterson, and Hal Landsberry. He also wrote big band arrangements. He retired in 1968 due to illness and died in Albany, New York on October 15, 1972.

References

1908 births
1972 deaths
20th-century American pianists
American jazz pianists
American male pianists
Jazz musicians from New York (state)
Musicians from New York (state)
People from Cohoes, New York
20th-century American male musicians
American male jazz musicians